Firas Al-Ghamdi (born 3 December 1999), is a Saudi Arabian professional footballer who plays as a midfielder for Al-Ahli.

Career statistics

Club

Notes

References

External links

1999 births
Living people
Sportspeople from Riyadh
Saudi Arabian footballers
Saudi Arabia youth international footballers
Association football midfielders
Saudi Professional League players
Saudi First Division League players
Al-Ahli Saudi FC players
Segunda División B players
Gimnàstic de Tarragona footballers
Saudi Arabian expatriate footballers
Expatriate footballers in Spain
Saudi Arabian expatriate sportspeople in Spain